Desi Kattey is a 2014 Indian Hindi-language action-drama film directed and produced by Anand Kumar under the banner of Anand Kumar Productions. The film was released on 26 September 2014. The story and screenplay is written by Aaryaan Saxena. It features actor Sunil Shetty in the lead role. Creative and Executive Producer is Aryan Saha. Music of the film was composed by Kailash Kher.

Cast 
 Sunil Shetty as Lieutenant Major Suryakant Rathore
 Jay Bhanushali as Gyani
 Akhil Kapur as Pali  
 Sasha Agha as Paridhi Rathore
 Tia Bajpai as Guddi
 Ashutosh Rana
 Murli Sharma
 Nishikant Dixit as Jailer Shukla
 Santosh Shukla
 Claudia Ciesla as an item number Patne Wali Hoon

Production

Filming 
Filming locations include Puri, Delhi, Kanpur and Mumbai.

Soundtrack
The soundtrack of Desi Kattey was composed by Kailash Kher.

Track listing

References

External links

2014 films
2010s Hindi-language films
Indian action drama films
Films scored by Kailash Kher
2014 action drama films